Skaraitiškė Manor is a former residential manor in Skaraitiškė village, Raseiniai District Municipality, Lithuania.

References

Manor houses in Lithuania
Classicism architecture in Lithuania